Know Your Enemy is the third studio album by American thrash metal band Lȧȧz Rockit. It was released in 1987 on Roadrunner Records/Enigma Records and follows 1985's No Stranger to Danger.

Track listing

Notes
 The 2005 re-issue by Old Metal Records contains the 1983 demo Prelude to Death tacked onto "Shit's Ugly" after a two-minute silence.
 The 2009 re-issue by Massacre Records contains a DVD from a 1986 live performance in Eindhoven.

Credits
 Michael Coons – vocals
 Aaron Jellum – guitars
 Phil Kettner – guitars
 Willie Lange – bass
 Victor Agnello – drums

Guest musician
 Scott Singer – keyboards, programming

Guest musician
 Jeff Sadowski – album concept, artwork
 Jeff Weller – album concept, executive producer
 Patrick Pending – art direction
 Robert Janover – photography
 Roy Rowland – producer, engineering
 Eddy Schreyer – mastering
 Keith Madigan – photography
 Neil Zlozower – photography
 Kay Arbuckle – engineering (assistant)

References

External links
BNR Metal band page

1987 albums
Lȧȧz Rockit albums